The women's 200 metre individual medley event at the 2000 Summer Olympics took place on 18–19 September at the Sydney International Aquatic Centre in Sydney, Australia.

Yana Klochkova, Ukraine's swimming pride and three-time European champion, became the fourth swimmer in Olympic history to strike a medley double, since Claudia Kolb did so in 1968, Tracy Caulkins in 1984, and Michelle Smith in 1996. Leading from start to finish, she established a sterling time of 2:10.68 to cut off Lin Li's eight-year Olympic record by a comfortable margin of 0.95 seconds. Romania's Beatrice Câșlaru, who shared the European title with Klochkova in the event, raced to silver with a national record of 2:12.57 on the rear of a dominant breaststroke leg. Meanwhile, U.S. swimmer Cristina Teuscher took home the bronze in 2:13.32 to touch out Canada's Marianne Limpert (2:13.44) by 12-hundredths of a second.

Limpert was followed in fifth by her teammate Joanne Malar (2:13.70) and in sixth by Russia's Oxana Verevka (2:13.88). Previously competed for Brazil in Atlanta four years earlier, Gabrielle Rose finished seventh in 2:14.82, while Japan's Tomoko Hagiwara rounded out the field with an eighth-place time of 2:15.64.

Notable swimmers missed out the top 8 final, featuring China's Chen Yan, who recorded the second fastest time ever in the event's history but faded badly to place ninth (2:15.27); and Australia's home favorite Elli Overton, who finished her semifinal run with an eleventh-place effort (2:15.74).

Records
Prior to this competition, the existing world and Olympic records were as follows.

The following new world and Olympic records were set during this competition.

Results

Heats

Semifinals

Semifinal 1

Semifinal 2

Final

* Also a European and a Ukrainian record.

References

External links
Official Olympic Report

M
2000 in women's swimming
Women's events at the 2000 Summer Olympics